Diego Roberto Godín Leal (born 16 February 1986) is a Uruguayan professional footballer who plays as a centre-back for Argentine Primera División club Vélez Sarsfield and captains the Uruguay national team.

Regarded as one of the best defenders of his generation, he started his professional career with Cerro and three years later was transferred to Primera División side Nacional. He since spent most of his professional career in Spain, representing Villarreal and Atlético Madrid and winning eight titles with the latter club, including the La Liga title in the 2013–14 season. He also played in Italy with Inter Milan and Cagliari, and in Brazil with Atlético Mineiro.

A Uruguay international since 2005, Godín is the country's all-time most-capped player. He represented the national side at four World Cups and six Copa América tournaments, winning the 2011 edition of the latter competition.

Early life
Godín was born in Rosario to Julio Godín and Iris Leal. Aged 4, during a family gathering, he nearly drowned after trying to catch fish in a river, but eventually swam to shore without the help of anybody.

Club career

Uruguay and Villarreal
Godín started his professional career with Cerro at the age of 17. After his good performances, he was transferred to Primera División powerhouse Nacional, where he quickly became captain due to his maturity and professionalism.

In August 2007, Godín signed a five-year deal with La Liga side Villarreal, scoring in just his second game, a 3–2 away loss against Osasuna on 7 October, and participating in 24 matches in their best league placement ever (second). He consolidated his starting position in the subsequent seasons, mostly partnering Argentine Gonzalo Rodríguez in the heart of the back four.

Atlético Madrid
On 4 August 2010, after experiencing his best season at Villarreal – 36 games, three goals – Godín joined Atlético Madrid on a five-year contract, after the two clubs agreed an initial fee believed to be around €8 million or £6.6 million. He made his official debut for the Colchoneros on the 27th, playing the entire 2–0 win against Inter Milan in the UEFA Super Cup.

Godín signed a new contract with Atlético on 1 November 2013, keeping him at the club until 2018. He scored four league goals during the campaign, including one on the last matchday on 17 May 2014 against Barcelona which equalised the game at 1–1 to earn his team its first league title in 18 years. A week later, again through a header, he repeated the feat in the final of the UEFA Champions League to put his team ahead, but Real Madrid eventually won 4–1.

In 2015, Godín rejected a transfer to Manchester City, managed by his former Villarreal boss Manuel Pellegrini. On 28 October 2017 he became the foreign player with most appearances for the club, surpassing fellow stopper Luis Perea after his 315th against Villarreal; he was nominated for the 2016 and 2018 Ballon d'Or awards.

On 20 February 2019, Godín scored the second goal in 2–0 home victory over Juventus in the Champions League round of 16. On 7 May, the 33-year-old announced he would be departing the Metropolitano Stadium after a nine-year tenure and, on 1 June, he symbolically handed over the captain armband to Koke in the 1–1 draw against Sevilla.

Inter Milan
On 1 July 2019, Inter Milan announced they had signed Godín for free on a three-year deal. It was reported that he had already agreed to a pre-contract the previous January. He made his debut in Serie A on 1 September, coming on for Antonio Candreva for the final 11 minutes of a 2–1 win at Cagliari.

In a season in which Inter finished one point behind champions Juventus, Godín scored his first Nerazzurri goal on 13 July 2020 in a 3–1 home victory over Torino. On 21 August he equalised against Sevilla in the 2020 UEFA Europa League Final in Cologne, a 3–2 loss for his side; only five other men had scored in the finals of European football's two top tournaments.

Cagliari
On 24 September 2020, Godín joined Cagliari on a three-year contract. He played his first match for them on 4 October, in a 5–2 away defeat to Atalanta where he also scored. 

Godín left on 12 January 2022 by mutual agreement.

Atlético Mineiro
On 12 January 2022, the 36-year-old Godín agreed to a one-year deal with Atlético Mineiro. He scored on his debut on 6 February, a 3–0 win over Patrocinense in the Campeonato Mineiro. On 20 February, he started in the 2022 Supercopa do Brasil which Atlético won after beating Flamengo in a penalty shootout.

In April 2022, Godín said that one of the reasons for which he had returned to South American football was to play the Copa Libertadores, his return marking the first time he appeared in the tournament after a 15-year hiatus. On 20 June, after failing to break into the starting team and aiming to play at the upcoming World Cup for Uruguay, he announced his departure in mutual terms.

Vélez Sarsfield
On 21 June 2022, Godín joined Vélez Sarsfield on a one-and-a-half year contract.

International career
In 2005, at the age of 19, Godín made his debut for Uruguay in a friendly defeat against Mexico in Guadalajara. His first international goal came in another exhibition game, with Serbia and Montenegro in May 2006. He represented the nation at the 2007 Copa América, playing in the opening 0–3 defeat to Peru before losing his place to Andrés Scotti in Uruguay's run to fourth place.

Godín was selected for the squad at the 2010 FIFA World Cup in South Africa. He started in the opening match against France (0–0) in Cape Town, and played in a further four matches for the eventual semi-finalists.

In 2011, Godín featured in Uruguay's successful 2011 Copa América campaign, making one appearance as a late substitute in a 3–0 defeat of Paraguay in the final after being bedridden for several days with a virus. He also participated in the 2013 FIFA Confederations Cup, partnering Diego Lugano in defence in four of the team's five matches as they reached the semi-finals.

Godín was selected by coach Óscar Tabárez for the 2014 World Cup and captained the team in three of their four games due to Lugano's absence through injury. On 24 June, he headed the only goal against Italy in the final group fixture, sending the country through to the knockout stage.

In May 2015, Godín was named as captain for Uruguay's defence of the Copa América during the 2015 continental tournament in Chile. He was also picked for the Copa América Centenario squad, heading home from a Carlos Sánchez long cross in the opener against Mexico where both teams ended with ten players (1–3 loss). He won his 100th cap in the following match, a 0–1 defeat to Venezuela at the Lincoln Financial Field.

Godín was also selected for the 2018 World Cup. The following 25 March, at the 2019 China Cup, he made his 126th appearance against Thailand, surpassing Maxi Pereira as the most capped player in the national team's history. 

In June 2019, Godín skippered the team to the quarter-finals of the Copa América in Brazil. He repeated the feat two years later, in the same country. He played the full 90 minutes of his 150th cap on 10 October 2021, a 3–0 loss away to Argentina in 2022 World Cup qualification.

Style of play
Despite his lack of pace or significant athleticism, Godín was regarded by pundits as one of the best and most consistent defenders in the world, and as one of the leading centre-backs of his generation. During the 2018 World Cup, Jack Watson of The Independent described him as "the best central defender in the world." 

An intelligent centre-back, Godín was mainly known for his leadership, positioning and calm composure, which allowed him to organise his back-line, read the game and anticipate plays. Aggressive, competitive and physical, he was also known for his aerial ability and his capacity to time his jumps effectively, which enabled him to defend high balls, score goals with his head on set pieces, and beat out larger players to the ball in the air.

Godín also stood out for his capacity to time his challenges, make blocks, interceptions and win the ball. Moreover, he was strong in one–on-one situations as his defensive positioning often allowed opposition players little time or space on the ball. In addition to his defensive skills, he was also known for his technique, ball–playing ability and capacity to carry the ball out from the defence, which allowed him start plays from the back and create chances for teammates.

Personal life
Godín married Sofia, daughter of José Herrera, a Uruguayan international who played in Serie A for Cagliari alongside compatriot Enzo Francescoli. He is close friends with Antoine Griezmann, who played with him at Atlético Madrid. During the 2018 World Cup quarter-finals match against France, the latter did not celebrate his goal out of respect for the former and also club teammate José María Giménez; Godín is also godfather to Griezmann's daughter.

Career statistics

Club

International

Honours

Atlético Madrid
La Liga: 2013–14
Copa del Rey: 2012–13
Supercopa de España: 2014
UEFA Europa League: 2011–12, 2017–18
UEFA Super Cup: 2010, 2012, 2018
UEFA Champions League runner-up: 2013–14, 2015–16

Inter Milan
UEFA Europa League runner-up: 2019–20

Atlético Mineiro
Supercopa do Brasil: 2022
Campeonato Mineiro: 2022

Uruguay
Copa América: 2011
China Cup: 2018, 2019

Individual
La Liga Player of the Month: April 2014, May 2014
La Liga Team of the Season: 2013–14, 2015–16
UEFA Champions League Squad of the Season: 2013–14, 2015–16, 2016–17
UEFA Team of the Year: 2014
UEFA Champions League Team of the Group Stage: 2015
La Liga Best Defender: 2015–16
UEFA La Liga Team of the Season: 2015–16
European Sports Media Team of the Year: 2015–16
UEFA Europa League Squad of the Season: 2017–18
FIFA World Cup Dream Team: 2018
IFFHS Men's World Team: 2018

See also
List of footballers with 100 or more caps

References

External links

1986 births
Living people
People from Rosario, Uruguay
Uruguayan people of French descent
Uruguayan footballers
Association football defenders
Uruguayan Primera División players
C.A. Cerro players
Club Nacional de Football players
La Liga players
Villarreal CF players
Atlético Madrid footballers
Serie A players
Inter Milan players
Cagliari Calcio players
Campeonato Brasileiro Série A players
Clube Atlético Mineiro players
Argentine Primera División players
Club Atlético Vélez Sarsfield footballers
UEFA Europa League winning players
Uruguay international footballers
2007 Copa América players
2010 FIFA World Cup players
2011 Copa América players
2013 FIFA Confederations Cup players
2014 FIFA World Cup players
2015 Copa América players
Copa América Centenario players
2018 FIFA World Cup players
2019 Copa América players
2021 Copa América players
2022 FIFA World Cup players
Copa América-winning players
FIFA Century Club
Uruguayan expatriate footballers
Expatriate footballers in Spain
Expatriate footballers in Italy
Expatriate footballers in Brazil
Expatriate footballers in Argentina
Uruguayan expatriate sportspeople in Spain
Uruguayan expatriate sportspeople in Italy
Uruguayan expatriate sportspeople in Brazil
Uruguayan expatriate sportspeople in Argentina